Juan Méndez de Villafranca, O.P. (died 1577) was a Roman Catholic prelate who served as Bishop of Santa Marta (1577).

Biography
Juan Méndez de Villafranca was born in Villafranca de los Barros, Spain and ordained a priest in the Order of Preachers.
On 14 Apr 1577, he was appointed during the papacy of Pope Gregory XIII as Bishop of Santa Marta.
He served as Bishop of Santa Marta until his death in Dec 1577.

References

External links and additional sources
 (for Chronology of Bishops) 
 (for Chronology of Bishops) 

16th-century Roman Catholic bishops in New Granada
Bishops appointed by Pope Gregory XIII
1577 deaths
Dominican bishops
Roman Catholic bishops of Santa Marta